The 2012 NAB Cup was the Australian Football League (AFL) pre-season competition played before the 2012 home-and-away season. The games were played between 17 February and 18 March 2012.

The competition format was changed for the second consecutive season, although the format was similar to that used in the previous year. As part of this year's competition, the NAB Regional Challenge was dissolved, with live matches to be staged at both regular AFL venues and select regional centres.

The format for the 2012 NAB Cup was as follows:
Weeks 1 and 2: (Round 1 is split over weeks 1 and 2) The eighteen teams were split into six pools of three teams each. The three teams in each pool played each other in games of two 20-minute halves, with all three games being played over a three-hour period at the one venue.
Weeks 3 and 4: (Round 2 and 3) The eighteen teams played a full length match each week in either metropolitan or regional areas.
Week 5: (Round 4) The two best ranked teams played in the NAB Cup Grand Final. The other sixteen teams will play a full length practice match in either metropolitan or regional areas.

Games
The fixtures were announced by the AFL on 26 October 2011, while the playing order of first-round games were announced by the AFL on 23 January 2012.

Round 1

Round 2

Round 3

Grand Final

NAB Challenge

Ladder
<onlyinclude>

See also
2012 AFL season

References

NAB Cup
Australian Football League pre-season competition